In Oklahoma, U.S. Highway 62 (US 62) runs diagonally across the state, from the Texas state line in far southwestern Oklahoma to the Arkansas state line near Fayetteville. The highway passes through fifteen of Oklahoma's counties. Along the way the route serves two of Oklahoma's largest cities, Lawton and Oklahoma City, as well as many regionally important cities, like Altus, Chickasha, Muskogee, and Tahlequah. Despite this, US-62 has no lettered spur routes like many other U.S. routes in Oklahoma do.

Since 1930, US-62 has been a part of Oklahoma's highway system. The section of the Interstate system's route that passes through Oklahoma City was altered several times after it was established in order to accommodate the presence of the new freeways. The present-day route of US-62 includes concurrencies with I-44, I-240, I-35, and I-40.

Route description

Southwestern Oklahoma
It then passes through that town, the county seat, where it serves as the southern terminus of State Highway 30. US-62 meets the northern terminus of SH-5 in Gould. The highway passes through unincorporated McQueen  and then enters Jackson County. Just east of Duke, the route crosses SH-34.  later, US-62 becomes a multilane highway and begins a concurrency with SH-6. The two highways travel together into Altus, where they intersect US-283. SH-6 follows US-283 northward out of town, while US-62 heads east towards Headrick. US-62 runs just north of that town before crossing the North Fork of the Red River onto the Kiowa–Tillman County line.

US-62 continues eastward, sending US-62 BUS north to Snyder, which was the original US-62 alignment in the area. The county line then turns south of US-62, and the route has an interchange with US-183. US-62 heads farther east, meeting the other end of US-62 BUS  later. The road then enters Comanche County, where it serves as the southern border of Fort Sill. It serves as the southern terminus of another Oklahoma state highway, SH-115, near Cache. A few miles of the highway east of SH-115 is freeway-grade. Continuing east, US-62 becomes an expressway, Rogers Lane, that serves the north side of Lawton (along with several Ft. Sill gates). In eastern Lawton, the highway has an interchange with Interstate 44 and begins a concurrency with it (joining at Exit 40B), along with US-277 and US-281.

I-44/US-62/277/281 head northward through Fort Sill. At Exit 45, the freeway serves as the eastern terminus of State Highway 49. The three U.S. routes split off at Exit 46, with I-44 continuing onto the northern section of the H. E. Bailey Turnpike. US-277 splits off to the east  later. US-62/281 then meet SH-19 in Apache. The three routes continue into Anadarko, where State Highway 8 briefly joins the concurrency. US-283 and SH-8 split off to the north, while US-62/SH-9 head out of town to the east.

Central Oklahoma

US-62/SH-9 cross into Grady County just west of Verden. At the western limits of Chickasha, US-81 joins the concurrency. In downtown Chickasha, US-81 splits off to the south, and US-277 once again joins with US-62. In far eastern Chickasha, the routes have an interchange with I-44 (the H.E. Bailey Turnpike). US-62/277/SH-9 serve as the southern terminus of SH-92 and the western terminus of SH-39. The three highways then angle northeast towards Blanchard, where they are briefly joined by State Highway 76. Northeast of Blanchard, they are carried by an expressway. SH-9 splits off at a diamond interchange that also serves as the eastern terminus of the H.E. Bailey Turnpike Spur. The two U.S. routes continue north into Newcastle, running through town on a five-lane (two lanes in each direction plus center turn lane) alignment. On the northern rim of Newcastle, the two routes encounter I-44 once again, at the northern terminus of the Bailey Turnpike. US-62 joins eastbound I-44 toward Oklahoma City, while US-277 terminates at the interchange.

I-44/US-62 pick up State Highway 37 at Exit 107, and the three highways cross the Canadian River into Cleveland County and Oklahoma City. SH-37 then splits off at Exit 110. Just north of the Oklahoma County line, I-44 has an interchange at the western terminus of Interstate 240 at Exit 115, and US-62 follows it east to Exit 4B, where it begins to concur with I-35/US-77. I-35/US-62/77 head northward to the Fort Smith Junction. US-77 splits off to join with Interstate 235, while I-35/US-77 join with eastbound I-40/US-270. I-35/US-62 split off to the north after just over a mile. US-62 leaves I-35 at Exit 130, turning east onto N.E. 23rd St., an at-grade street

US-62 serves some of Oklahoma City's eastern suburbs, including far northern Midwest City, far southern Spencer, Nicoma Park, and Choctaw. In eastern Harrah, the route meets the west terminus of State Highway 270. The highway then crosses into far southern Lincoln County, where it crosses SH-120 at Midway. US-62 runs through two more unincorporated communities, Fowler and Jacktown; the latter is the site of the US-62/US-177 junction. US-62 enters Meeker  later, where it meets up with SH-18.  further east, in Prague, it encounters US-377/SH-99.

Green Country

US-62 enters eastern Oklahoma's Green Country as it crosses into Okfuskee County west of Paden. It begins to turn southeast, intersecting State Highway 48 west of Castle, before joining once again with I-40 near Okemah, at Exit 221. US-75 also joins the interstate,  farther east at Exit 231. The two U.S. routes split off at Exit 240B, where they continue the mainline of the Indian Nation Turnpike, which terminates at I-40. The two U.S. routes serve eastern Henryetta, and west of Dewar, they are the western terminus of U.S. Highway 266. In Okmulgee, US-62 turns east while US-75 continues north toward the Tulsa area. US-62 heads through Morris, where it intersects SH-52. The highway then has a  overlap with SH-72, after which it begins a concurrency with US-64.

US-62/64 split up in Muskogee, where US-62 briefly overlaps with US-69. On the east side of town, it has an interchange with the Muskogee Turnpike/SH-165 freeway. Near Ft. Gibson, US-62 begins to concur with State Highway 10, and the two routes stay joined through Tahlequah. US-62 starts to overlap State Highway 51 in Tahlequah as well; the two highways split up near Eldon. The route enters Adair County near Proctor. It intersects with US-59 in Westville before US-62 crosses the state line into Arkansas.

History
When US-62 first appeared on the state highway map in 1930, it had the same basic routing as it did today. In 1930, most of the highway was of gravel or earthen construction. The only portions of the highway that were paved were from Chickasha to Tabler, from Newcastle to Oklahoma City and Meeker, from Okemah to Morris, and from just south of the US-64 junction to Fort Gibson. By 1948, the entire stretch of US-62 through Oklahoma had been paved.

Oklahoma City routing
On 1950-03-06, US-62 was rerouted through Oklahoma City. US-62 followed Newcastle Boulevard into the city and turned eastbound onto S.E. 29th Street, which it followed to Robinson Avenue. It then turned north onto Robinson, which was also US-77, towards downtown. Through downtown, US-62 followed Robinson, while US-77 paralleled it one block to the east on Broadway. At N.E. 23rd Street, US-62 turned east, concurring with US-270, US-66 CITY, and the second State Highway 1. US-77 also ran along 23rd Street from Broadway to Lincoln Boulevard, where it split off to the north, along with US-66 CITY. US-62/270/SH-1 then continued along 23rd Street to Spencer.

US-62 was realigned once again on April 6, 1955.

US-62 was realigned for a third time on September 4, 1961. This routing was only meant to be temporary, following Agnew, Exchange, and Reno Avenues to downtown. This change was followed up by the September 4, 1963 rerouting, which put US-62 onto its present-day routing (though I-240 did not exist yet, and I-44 still ended at I-35).

Major intersections

Special routes

Snyder business loop

Business U.S. Highway 62 (Bus. It starts at US 62 west of Snyder, intersects U.S. Route 183 in Snyder, and ends at US 62 east of Snyder.

Major intersections

Henryetta business loop

U.S. Route 62 Business in Henryetta, Oklahoma, in Okmulgee County is another business route of US 62. It begins at I-40 exit 237 west of town. It then continues east through the town to end at US-62/75 east of downtown. The entirety of the route is concurrent with Business Loop I-40 and U.S. 75 Business.

Muskogee business loop

U.S. Route 62 Business in Muskogee, Oklahoma, in Muskogee County is a third business route of US 62 in Oklahoma. The route runs in an overlap with U.S. Route 64 Business along-Okmulgee Avenue and then turns north away from that route along North Main Street.

Tahlequah business loop

U.S. Route 62 Business in Tahlequah, Oklahoma, in Cherokee County, Oklahoma is a fourth business route of US 62 in Oklahoma. The route runs along former sections of the main route along Muskogee Avenue beginning at the western terminus of US 62/OK 82's overlap with OK 51, then runs north into downtown Tahlequah, where it turns right running east along East Downing Street until reaching its terminus at the east end of the US 62/OK 82 overlap.

References

External links

Oklahoma Highways: US 62—Lawton to Altus

U.S. Route 62
U.S. Route 62
U.S. Route 62
U.S. Route 62
U.S. Route 62
U.S. Route 62
U.S. Route 62
U.S. Route 62
U.S. Route 62
U.S. Route 62
U.S. Route 62
U.S. Route 62
U.S. Route 62
U.S. Route 62
U.S. Route 62
U.S. Highways in Oklahoma
 Oklahoma